"Where Have All the Good People Gone?" is a song by Sam Roberts. The song was originally released in 2002 on Roberts' EP The Inhuman Condition. The song was re-recorded and released as the lead single from his major label debut album, We Were Born in a Flame. The song is also featured on MuchMusic's compilation album, Big Shiny Tunes 8. Between 1995 and 2016, "Where Have All the Good People Gone?" was the 12th most played song by a Canadian artist on rock radio stations in Canada.

Commercial Performance
The song reached #29 on Canada's Singles chart. The single was certified Gold by the CRIA in May 2003.

References

External links

2003 singles
Sam Roberts songs
Songs written by Sam Roberts
2002 songs